The 2019 Circle K Firecracker 250 was a NASCAR Xfinity Series race held on July 5, 2019, at Daytona International Speedway in Daytona Beach, Florida. Contested over 100 laps on the  superspeedway, it was the 16th race of the 2019 NASCAR Xfinity Series season.

Background

Track

The race was held at Daytona International Speedway, a race track located in Daytona Beach, Florida, United States. Since opening in 1959, the track is the home of the Daytona 500, the most prestigious race in NASCAR. In addition to NASCAR, the track also hosts races of ARCA, AMA Superbike, USCC, SCCA, and Motocross. The track's  infield includes the  Lake Lloyd, which has hosted powerboat racing. The speedway is owned and operated by International Speedway Corporation.

Entry list

Practice

Final practice

Qualifying

Qualifying results

Race

Summary
Tyler Reddick began on pole. The first caution occurred when Caesar Bacarella lost control of his car and spun, causing seven other drivers to be involved. Landon Cassill was the only driver taken out in this caution due to a bent track bar.

As the first stage neared its end, Ross Chastain blocked Reddick and narrowly missed the wall, but Reddick made contact with it. The stack-up from the two drivers resulted in Sheldon Creed and John Hunter Nemechek simultaneously spinning from contact, bringing out the second caution.

Chastain won Stage 1. On the final lap of the first stage, Justin Haley blocked several drivers from making a run, causing them to pass him from underneath, but NASCAR deemed he forced them below the double-yellow line, and sent him to the rear of the field.

Reddick got a flat tire in the middle of Stage 2 and collected Chase Briscoe, ending his day. A. J. Allmendinger blocked Chastain to win Stage 2. The first “Big One” occurred in the middle of the field later on and collected ten drivers. Riley Herbst spun with 21 laps remaining, but no caution was thrown. Another “Big One” 7 laps later took out fifteen drivers, including Michael Annett and Cole Custer, and also brought out a red flag.

On the final restart, Shane Lee and Justin Allgaier both spun out on separate occasions, but no caution was thrown for either instance. The trio of Kaulig Racing drivers proved too fast for any other driver to contend them. Chastain would win the race and was followed by teammates Haley and Allmendinger, Allmendinger would soon be disqualified after failing post race inspection.

Stage Results

Stage One
Laps: 30

Stage Two
Laps: 30

Final Stage Results

Stage Three
Laps: 40

After the race
A. J. Allmendinger was disqualified from his third-place finish after his car failed post-race inspection. This was the third consecutive week where a driver was disqualified with respect to the 2019 rules. Allmendinger's car failed an engine vacuum test, dialling back the initial 1-2-3 finish for Kaulig Racing to simply a 1-2 finish. Allmendinger was also stripped of his stage points after being relegated to last place.

References

Circle K Firecracker 250
NASCAR races at Daytona International Speedway
Circle K Firecracker 250
2019 NASCAR Xfinity Series